is a Japanese actress. At a young age, she began making TV appearances on Oha Suta and was part of the Oha-Girls. She has done some commercials for Glico. One of her most notable roles was Sakura Nishihori/Bouken Pink in the Super Sentai series GoGo Sentai Boukenger.

Personal life

On February 22, 2014, Suenaga announced that she had married Olympic judo medalist Hiroshi Izumi.

Filmography

Movies 
REX Kyouryuu monogatari (1993)
Nihon-ichi Mijikai "Haha" e no tegami (1995)
KOKKURI (1997)
Battle Royale II: Requiem (2003)
GoGo Sentai Boukenger the Movie: The Most Powerful Precious(2006)
GoGo Sentai Boukenger vs. Super Sentai (2007)
LIFE (2007)
Juken Sentai Gekiranger vs. Boukenger (2008)
Shibatora (2008) as Rika Machida

References

External links
Official blog 
Official agency profile 

1986 births
Living people
Actresses from Kanagawa Prefecture
Japanese child actresses